Salim Khan Shams al-Dinlu was an early 17th-century Safavid military leader and official of Turkoman origin. A member of the Shams al-Dinlu tribe, of which he was the leader for numerous years, he served as the governor (hakem) of Akhaltsikhe (Akhesqeh, also spelled as Akheshkheh), the provincial capital of Samtskhe (also known as Meskheti, Masq, or Meshkhia), from 1623 to 1627. Apart from this post, he also served as the governor of the Shams al-Dinlu tribal district in the Karabagh Province for numerous years. His son Ismail (Esma'il) succeeded him in 1629 as both the head of the tribe as well as the governor of the Shams al-Dinlu district.

Sources
 
  
 

17th-century deaths
Iranian Turkmen people
Safavid generals
Safavid governors
People from Akhaltsikhe
17th-century people of Safavid Iran